Columbinae is a subfamily of birds from the family Columbidae. Otherwise, four genera Geotrygon, Leptotila, Starnoenas and Zenaida form subfamily Leptotilinae.

Genera
Caloenas
Chalcophaps
Claravis
Columba
Columbina
Gallicolumba
Geopelia
Geophaps
Geotrygon
Henicophaps
Leptotila
Leucosarcia – wonga pigeon
Macropygia
Metriopelia
Nesoenas
Ocyphaps – crested pigeon
Oena – Namaqua dove
Patagioenas
Petrophassa
Phaps
Reinwardtoena
Spilopelia
Starnoenas – blue-headed quail-dove
Streptopelia
Trugon – thick-billed ground pigeon
Turacoena
Turtur
Uropelia – long-tailed ground dove
Zenaida
Including four extinct monotypic genera:
†Arenicolumba
†Dysmoropelia
†Ectopistes
†Microgoura

References

 
Columbidae